Back to Reality is the second single released from Intelligent Hoodlum debut album, Intelligent Hoodlum. Produced by Marley Marl and remixed by Marl  and C.J. Macintosh, the single peaked at 10 on the Hot Rap Singles.

Single track listing
"Back to Reality"
"Back to Reality" (Marleys Mix)
"Back to Reality" (UK Mix)
"Back to Reality" (UK Dub)
"Live & Direct From The House Of Hits" (Feat. Craig G)

Charts

Samples
Back to Reality
"I Get Lifted" by George McCrae
"Back to Life" by Soul II Soul
Back to Reality (Marleys Mix)
"Sister Sanctified" by Stanley Turrentine
"Be Thankful for What You Got" by William DeVaughn
"Can't Get Away (Special Club "Dub" Mix)" by Carol Williams
"Somethin' Funky" by Big Daddy Kane
Back to Reality (UK Mix)
"Be Thankful for What You Got" by William DeVaughn
"Dancing Room Only" by Harvey Scales
Live & Direct From The House Of Hits
"I'm Your Puppet" by James & Bobby Purify
"Just a Friend" by Biz Markie

References

1990 singles
Tragedy Khadafi songs
A&M Records singles
1990 songs
Songs written by Marley Marl
Song recordings produced by Marley Marl